The 2006 Red Bull Air Race World Championship was the fourth Red Bull Air Race season and second as a World Championship. It began on March 18, 2006, and ended on November 19.

In the 2006 season Rotterdam in the Netherlands, Zeltweg in Austria, and Rock of Cashel in Ireland were removed from the calendar. The number of races increased from seven to nine. The new places were Barcelona in Spain, Berlin in Germany, Saint Petersburg in Russia, Istanbul in Turkey and Perth in Australia. Only eight of the races were held after the cancellation of the 4th leg in Saint Petersburg. The race in Longleat, United Kingdom was also cancelled due to high winds, however, Friday's Qualifying results were used as the official race results.

Michael Goulian from the US, who had paused in 2005, returned in 2006 to compete again as the 11th pilot. The American pilot Kirby Chambliss, took four wins and became World Champion with a total of 38 points followed by Hungarian Péter Besenyei (35 points). 2005 World Champion Mike Mangold from the United States, finished third with 30 points.

Race calendar

Standings and results

Legend:
 CAN: Cancelled
 DQ: Disqualified
 DNS: Did not show

Aircraft

External links

 Details of 2006 Air Races

Red Bull Air Race World Championship seasons
Red Bull Air Race World Series
Red Bull Air Race World Series